Sánchez Ramírez is a province that constituting one of the 32 provinces of the Dominican Republic. It is divided into 4 municipalities and its capital city is Cotuí. Located in the Cibao Sur region in central Dominican Republic, it is bordered by the provinces of Duarte to the north, Monte Plata to the east and south, Monseñor Nouel to the south-west and west and La Vega to the north-west. It was formerly part of Duarte in 1952, and is named after Brigadier Juan Sánchez Ramírez, hero of the Battle of Palo Hincado (1808) at which Spanish rebels defeated the French occupying forces.

Municipalities and municipal districts
The province as of June 20, 2006 is divided into the following  municipalities (municipios) and municipal districts (distrito municipal - D.M.) within them:
Cevicos	
La Cueva (D.M.)	
Cotuí	
Quita Sueño (D.M.)
Platanal (D.M.)
Fantino	
La Mata	
Angelina (D.M.)
La Bija (D.M.)

The following is a sortable table of the municipalities and municipal districts with population figures as of the 2012 census. Urban population are those living in the seats (cabeceras literally heads) of municipalities or of municipal districts. Rural population are those living in the districts (Secciones literally sections) and neighborhoods (Parajes literally places) outside of them.

For comparison with the municipalities and municipal districts of other provinces see the list of municipalities and municipal districts of the Dominican Republic.

References

External links
  Oficina Nacional de Estadística, Statistics Portal of the Dominican Republic
  Oficina Nacional de Estadística, Maps with administrative division of the provinces of the Dominican Republic, downloadable in PDF format

 
Provinces of the Dominican Republic
States and territories established in 1952